Sergey Gridin (born 20 May 1987) is a Kazakh football player, who most recently played for FC Zhetysu.

Career

Club
In March 2015, Gridin signed with Latvian Higher League side FK Spartaks Jūrmala. In July 2014, Gridin moved to FC Ordabasy on a six-month contract from FC Atyrau. In February 2016 Gridin signed for newly promoted FC Akzhayik.

International
Gridin scored twice on his national team debut, a 2–1 victory over Azerbaijan, in a Euro 2012 qualifier on 3 June 2011.

Career Stats

Club

International goals

Honours
 Kazakhstan Cup Runner-up: 2 (2008, 2011)

References

External links

1987 births
Living people
Kazakhstani footballers
Kazakhstan Premier League players
FC Tobol players
FC Caspiy players
FC Astana players
FC Shakhter Karagandy players
FC Aktobe players
FC Zhetysu players
FC Ordabasy players
FC Okzhetpes players
FC Atyrau players
FC Akzhayik players
Association football forwards
Kazakhstan international footballers
Kazakhstan First Division players